Frank Stippler (born 9 April 1975) is a German professional racing driver. He has competed in such series as Deutsche Tourenwagen Masters, Rolex Sports Car Series and the Swedish Touring Car Championship. He won both the Porsche Supercup and Porsche Carrera Cup Germany series in 2003. He is also very successful in historic racing.

At the 2014 VLN DMV 250-Meilen-Rennen, Stippler qualified on pole position driving his Audi R8 LMS ultra with a lap time of 7:57.474 at the 24.358 km short layout, averaging 183.7 km/h.

Stippler started racing at the age of 18 in an Alfa Romeo Alfetta and is a race and development driver for Audi Sport.

Race results

Complete Porsche Supercup results
(key) (Races in bold indicate pole position) (Races in italics indicate fastest lap)

Complete Deutsche Tourenwagen Masters results
(key) (Races in bold indicate pole position) (Races in italics indicate fastest lap)

FIA GT competition results

FIA GT1 World Championship results

Complete FIA GT Series results

Complete Blancpain GT World Challenge Europe results

References

External links
 Official website
 Career statistics from Driver Database

1975 births
Living people
Sportspeople from Cologne
Racing drivers from North Rhine-Westphalia
German racing drivers
Deutsche Tourenwagen Masters drivers
FIA GT Championship drivers
FIA GT1 World Championship drivers
Swedish Touring Car Championship drivers
Porsche Supercup drivers
24 Hours of Daytona drivers
Rolex Sports Car Series drivers
Blancpain Endurance Series drivers
ADAC GT Masters drivers
WeatherTech SportsCar Championship drivers
24 Hours of Spa drivers
24H Series drivers
Audi Sport drivers
W Racing Team drivers
ISR Racing drivers
Phoenix Racing drivers
Team Joest drivers
Team Rosberg drivers
Mücke Motorsport drivers
G-Drive Racing drivers
Nürburgring 24 Hours drivers
Porsche Carrera Cup Germany drivers